The 2010 Copa Petrobras São Paulo was a professional tennis tournament played on outdoor red clay courts. It was the seventh edition of the tournament which is part of the 2010 ATP Challenger Tour. It took place in São Paulo, Brazil between 25 and 31 October 2010.

ATP entrants

Seeds

 Rankings are as of October 18, 2010.

Other entrants
The following players received wildcards into the singles main draw:
  Thomaz Bellucci
  Tiago Fernandes
  Christian Lindell
  Augusto Meirelles

The following players received a special entry into the singles main draw:
  Paul Capdeville

The following players received entry from the qualifying draw:
  Thomas Cazes-Carrère
  Nicolas Devilder
  Tiago Lopes
  Maxime Teixeira

The following player received entry as a Lucky loser into the singles main draw:
  Eládio Ribeiro Neto

Champions

Singles

 Marcos Daniel def.  Thomaz Bellucci, 6–1, 3–6, 6–3

Doubles

 Franco Ferreiro /  André Sá def.  Rui Machado /  Daniel Muñoz de la Nava, 3–6, 7–6(2), [10–8]

External links
Copa Petrobras de Tênis official website
ITF Search 
2010 Draws

2010 ATP Challenger Tour
Clay court tennis tournaments
Tennis tournaments in Brazil
Copa Petrobras São Paulo